Myrmecia is a genus of small to large venomous ants commonly known as bulldog ants or jack jumper ants. The genus was first established by Danish zoologist Johan Christian Fabricius in 1804 and is placed in the subfamily Myrmeciinae of the family Formicidae. There are currently 94 described species in this genus, 93 of which are valid and identifiable. Almost all species are endemic to Australia and can be found nowhere else, with an exception of a single species found in New Caledonia.

Species

Notes

References

Cited literature

Myrmecia